Edward P. Healy is a game designer who has worked primarily on role-playing games.

Career
On July 4, 1997, George Vasilakos, Alex Jurkat, and Ed Healy announced that they had formed the new gaming company, Eden Studios; they also acquired the rights to Conspiracy X to continue the line. Healy had suggested the name "Eden" because the group was trying to create their paradise job. Healy was forced to divest himself of his Eden ownership in 1997 when he joined Deloitte & Touche as a staff accountant, although he was allowed to continue with game design.

When Healy was working on a Risk-like dice mechanic, he found that Sorcerer's dice system was almost identical to what he had been working on; he struck up a friendship with the game's designer Ron Edwards, which led him to the Gaming Outpost and an experimental community of designers. The owners of Gaming Outpost soon asked Healy for help with business development, and he came up with the idea of creating a network of cobranded RPG sites, which would all feed into the Outpost. Bill Walton's RPG advocacy site The Escapist soon came aboard, and Healy created a site with Edwards in December 1999 called Hephaestus's Forge, the "Internet Home of Indie Roleplaying Games".

In June 2007, Healy founded Gamerati, a game marketing and promotions company, which he runs.

References

External links
 Home Page
 

1973 births
Living people
Role-playing game designers